Luciobarbus is a genus of ray-finned fishes in the family Cyprinidae. Its members are found in fresh and brackish waters of southern Europe, northern Africa, the wider Near East, the Aral and Caspian Seas, and rivers associated with these. Several species in the genus are threatened. Most species are fairly small to medium-sized cyprinids, but the genus also includes several members that can surpass  in length and the largest, the mangar (L. esocinus)  can reach .

Systematics
The type species is Luciobarbus esocinus, for which the genus was established by Heckel in 1843. The type species scientific name essentially means "pike-like pike-barbel" (after the northern pike, Esox lucius), though a more aliteral translation would be "pike-like wolf-barbel".

Like many other cyprinids, the present genus was long included in Barbus. It appears to be a very close relative of the typical barbels – which include that genus type species, Barbus barbus –, and may well warrant inclusion in Barbus. Many modern authors prefer to consider it a subgenus instead. It is, moreover, not entirely clear what species to place in Luciobarbus if it is deemed valid. The IUCN argues for a rather inclusive circumscription. Nonwithstanding the taxonomy and systematics of this ill-defined assemblage, their closest living relative is probably Aulopyge huegelii.

Species
The species in this genus:
 Luciobarbus albanicus (Steindachner, 1870) (Albanian barbel)
 Luciobarbus barbulus Heckel, 1847
 Luciobarbus biscarensis Boulenger, 1911
 Luciobarbus bocagei (Steindachner, 1864)
 Luciobarbus brachycephalus (Kessler, 1872) (Aral barbel)
 Luciobarbus callensis Valenciennes, 1842 (Algerian barb))
 Luciobarbus capito (Güldenstädt, 1773) (Bulatmai barbel)
 Luciobarbus caspius (L. S. Berg, 1914) (Caspian barbel)
 Luciobarbus comizo (Steindachner, 1864) (Iberian barbel)
 Luciobarbus escherichii (Steindachner, 1897) (Ankara barbel)
 Luciobarbus esocinus Heckel, 1843 (Mangar)
 Luciobarbus graecus Steindachner, 1896
 Luciobarbus graellsii (Steindachner, 1866) 
 Luciobarbus guercifensis Doadrio, Perea & Yahyahoui, 2016 (Guercif barbel)
 Luciobarbus guiraonis (Steindachner, 1866)
 Luciobarbus kersin (Heckel, 1843) (Kersin barbel)
 Luciobarbus kosswigi (M. S. Karaman (sr), 1971) (Kosswig’s barbel) 
 Luciobarbus kottelati Turan, Ekmekçi, İlhan & Engin, 2008 (Menderes barbel)
 Luciobarbus leptopogon G. H. W. Schimper, 1834
 Luciobarbus longiceps Valenciennes, 1842 (Jordan barbel)
 Luciobarbus lydianus (Boulenger, 1896) (Lydian barbel)
 Luciobarbus maghrebensis Doadrio, Perea & Yahyaoui, 2015 (Maghreb barbel) 
 Luciobarbus magniatlantis (Pellegrin, 1919)
 Luciobarbus microcephalus (Almaça (pt), 1967)
 Luciobarbus mursa (Güldenstädt, 1773) (Mursa)
 Luciobarbus mystaceus (Pallas, 1814) (Euphrates barbel)
 Luciobarbus nasus Günther, 1874)
 Luciobarbus pallaryi Pellegrin, 1919
 Luciobarbus pectoralis (Heckel, 1843) (Heckel’s Orontes barbel)
 Luciobarbus rabatensis Doadrio, Perea & Yahyaoui, 2015 (Rabat barbel) 
 Luciobarbus rifensis Doadrio, Casal-Lopez & Yahyaoui, 2015 (Rifian barbel) 
 Luciobarbus sclateri (Günther, 1868) (Andalusian barbel)
 Luciobarbus setivimensis Valenciennes, 1842
 Luciobarbus steindachneri (Almaça (pt), 1967)
 Luciobarbus subquincunciatus (Günther, 1868) (Mesopotamian barbel) 
 Luciobarbus xanthopterus Heckel, 1843 (Yellowfin barbel)
 Luciobarbus yahyaouii Doadrio, Casal-Lopez & Perea, 2016 (Yahyaoui barbel)
 Luciobarbus zayanensis Doadrio, Casal-Lopez & Perea, 2016 (Zayan barbel)

Footnotes

References
  (2008): Natural hybridization of Barbus bocagei x Barbus comizo (Cyprinidae) in Tagus River basin, central Spain [English with French abstract]. Cybium 32(2): 99-102. PDF fulltext
  (2007): Evolutionary origin of Lake Tana's (Ethiopia) small Barbus species: indications of rapid ecological divergence and speciation. Anim. Biol. 57(1): 39-48.  (HTML abstract)
  (2009): 2009 IUCN Red List of Threatened Species. Version 2009.1. Retrieved 2009-SEP-20.

 
Cyprinidae genera